The Palermos are a series of two-inch plastic collectible figurines created by David Gonzales. Representing an Italian American family and their associates, the Palermos debuted in 2004 as a spin-off of Gonzales' Homies figures.

Description 
In their fictional world, the Palermo family was once one of New York's most powerful Mafia groups. Trying to "go straight," they have established a family-run pizza restaurant. Whisper, one of the Homies, is related to the Palermos family.

Characters
The Palermos characters' biographies can be read at their website, which is part of the Homies family of sites.

Don Giuseppe Palermo – The family's "Godfather"
Baby Don Dino – second in line to Don Giuseppe as far as power in the family
Frankie The Hammer - Works in "collections" for the Family
Corradeo the Consigliere – advisor and lawyer to the Palermo family
Angie
Sebastiano the Sausagemaker – works at the "Palermo Family Pizza"
Father Francseco – a Catholic priest
Sally the Chef – also a worker at the "Palermo Family Pizza"
Ruggero the Sandman
Teflon Tony - Attorney for the Family who never has any charges "stick"
Vittorio the Violinist – a musician
Luigi the Waiter – another "Palermo Family Pizza" worker
Rico The Rat –  Under protection from the godfather, kicked out of the old country.
Freddie the Fed – an FBI agent
Officer Bruno The Baton – a police officer
Backroom Bennie – who handles money to Palermo associates
No Problem Paulie
Rocko the Trashman - Takes out the trash
Ivana
Vincenzio The Voice
Nicky No Neck
Vinnie The Weasel - Family flunkie 
Bobby The Blade
No Knuckles Louie

See also 
 Mijos

References

External links
 

Fictional Mafia crime families
2000s toys
Products introduced in 2004
Toy brands
Toy figurines